John Leslie Marshall (born 19 August 1940) is a British Conservative politician.

Early career
Marshall was educated at Harris Academy in Dundee, Glasgow Academy and the University of St Andrews. He then became a university lecturer. He attempted to enter Parliament a number of times before he was successful. In 1964 and 1966 he contested Dundee East, but was beaten by the Labour incumbent George Thomson, the first time as a Liberal National, and the second time in Conservative colours. He fought Lewisham East in the February 1974 general election, coming second to Labour's Roland Moyle.

Marshall served as a councillor in Aberdeen from 1968 until 1970 and then in Ealing from 1971 until 1986.

He was MEP for London North from 1979 to 1989.

Parliamentary career
Marshall lost to Michael Portillo in the selection for the 1984 Enfield Southgate by-election, but was later selected for Hendon South in the London Borough of Barnet and was elected as the Member of Parliament for that seat at the 1987 general election. He served as PPS to Tony Newton, when Newton was Leader of the House of Commons.

After the 1992 general election, the Boundary Commission recommended that the four Barnet seats be reduced to three. Sir Sydney Chapman was retained as the candidate for the Chipping Barnet seat, the only one not being abolished, and John Gorst, the sitting MP for Hendon North, was selected to contest the new Hendon constituency. Marshall was therefore pitched together with Hartley Booth, the MP for Finchley, in trying to win the nomination for the new seat of Finchley and Golders Green. Both MPs put a great deal of effort into the fight, hiring minibuses to ensure all their supporters got to the selection meeting; the contest became bitter when Booth accused Marshall of "signing up the dead and the dying" as Conservative members in order to boost his chances of victory.

The new Finchley seat, with similar boundaries to the old Finchley seat, was projected to be held for the Conservatives, albeit by a small majority; when Margaret Thatcher held the seat she normally had majorities of nearly 10,000. Despite most of the new constituency coming from Booth's old seat, Marshall won the selection contest on 1 November 1995, but went on to lose the contest for the seat to the Labour Party candidate Rudi Vis at the 1997 general election, in which the Conservatives experienced their worst electoral defeat in 91 years.

Notable losses included Portillo, who Marshall had lost to in the Conservative selection for the Enfield Southgate by-election thirteen years earlier, along with several cabinet ministers.

After Parliament
In May 1998, Marshall was elected to Barnet London Borough Council for Garden Suburb ward (based on Hampstead Garden Suburb) in his old constituency. He unsuccessfully sought to regain his Finchley and Golders Green seat at the 2001 general election, but Labour's Rudi Vis beat him by 3,716 votes. This was despite Baroness Thatcher herself coming to campaign for him in Golders Green.

Following the Conservative victory in local elections in 2002, he served in the Cabinet. Among other roles, Marshall served as Cabinet Member for Investment in Learning, responsible for implementing the Primary Schools rebuilding programme (known as PSCIP), and the Libraries Strategy, which modernised library provision across the Borough. He was an unsuccessful candidate for the leadership of the Conservative group in 2005.

Marshall was Mayor of the London Borough of Barnet in the municipal year 2008–2009. He did not stand at the 2010 elections.

References

 Times Guide to the House of Commons 1997, ed. by Tim Austin

External links 
 

Conservative Party (UK) MPs for English constituencies
Living people
1940 births
Councillors in the London Borough of Barnet
Mayors of places in Greater London
UK MPs 1987–1992
UK MPs 1992–1997
Conservative Party (UK) MEPs
MEPs for England 1979–1984
MEPs for England 1984–1989
People educated at Harris Academy
Alumni of the University of St Andrews
People educated at Finchley Grammar School
Councillors in Aberdeen
People associated with Dundee